The World Beyond is the second of two pilots for an occult detective television series. The first pilot, The World of Darkness, also starring Granville Van Dusen as Paul Taylor, premiered on Sunday, April 17, 1977. The World Beyond followed as a sequel on CBS  Friday, January 27, 1978.

Premise
Sports writer Paul Taylor (Granville Van Dusen) died while undergoing a surgical procedure but was retrieved from the brink of death. His brush with "the world beyond" allowed the dead to communicate with him and ask him to help a living person.

The World of Darkness
Dead for two minutes and 37 seconds following a motorcycle accident, Paul Taylor hears ghostly voices that draw him to the New England town of Woodvale. Taylor becomes involved in supernatural activity surrounding the Sandford family, whose recently buried patriarch was an apparent suicide.

Cast
Granville Van Dusen as Paul Taylor
Tovah Feldshuh as Clara Sandford
Beatrice Straight as Joanna Sandford
Gary Merrill as Dr. Thomas Madsen

The World Beyond
Taylor finds himself on a remote Maine island whose inhabitants are being menaced and killed by a golem made of mud and sticks.

Cast
Granville Van Dusen as Paul Taylor
JoBeth Williams as Marian Faber
Barnard Hughes as Andy Borchard
Richard Fitzpatrick as Frank Faber
Jan Van Evera as Sam Barker

External links
The World Beyond on the Internet Movie Database

1978 American television series debuts
1978 American television series endings
1970s American crime drama television series
Occult detective fiction
Television pilots not picked up as a series
Television films as pilots
American detective television series
CBS original programming